The 1985–86 Georgia Tech Yellow Jackets men's basketball team represented Georgia Institute of Technology during the 1985–86 NCAA Division I men's basketball season.

Roster

G Dalrymple
F Ferrell
C Ford
F Hammonds
F Mansell
G Martinson
G Neal
G Price
F Reese
F/C Salley
G Sherrod

Schedule and results

|-
!colspan=9 style=| Non-conference Regular season

|-
!colspan=9 style=| ACC regular season

|-
!colspan=9 style=| ACC Tournament

|-
!colspan=9 style=| NCAA Tournament

Rankings

Players in the 1986 NBA Draft

References

Georgia Tech Yellow Jackets men's basketball seasons
Georgia Tech
Georgia Tech